The public library Antonelliana is the main library of the city of Senigallia (AN), also home to the historical archive of the city.

Description 
The municipal library Antonelliana or "Biblioteca Antonelliana" is located in the immediate vicinity of the Foro Annonario, Senigallia in Italy. Approximately 23,000 visitors come each year, to patron the library, thanks to the congress hall, participate in summer meetings organized throughout the city and the educational workshops.

In addition to carrying out the normal function of a public library and hosting the historical archives of Senigallia, the Antonelliana library is also a media and newspaper library, youth information center, and hosts a WiFi network.

Collection

Originally the private collection of Leonardo Antonelli, consisting largely of religious material, the library was gifted to the municipality of Senigallia following his death in 1811. Initially preserved by the municipality, thanks in particular to cardinal Domenico Consolini, many materials have been added over the years. In the 60's, thanks to the communal administration purchasing numerous books and receiving other donations, the collection rose to 35000 books. Today the collection has about 80,000 pieces including historical documents related to the construction of La Fenice.

Historical archive

Among the manuscripts of the library there was also a copy of the Ethiopien text the Book of Enoch, one of the first to arrive in Europe. The origin of the manuscript has long been unknown. The orientalist Agostino Antonio Giorgi mentions it for the first time in a letter (not dated), written before 1775. It was only recently established that it came from the explorer James Bruce who had given it to Pope Clement XIV during a visit to Rome in December 1773. The manuscript, never translated or published, remained in the Biblioteca Antonelliana until after his death, Angelo Mai purchased it around 1825 for the Vatican Library making it for the first time available for international research.

History

The transfer to Senigallia
Despite the testamentary disposition of Nicolò Maria Antonelli, the library was transferred to Senigallia only becoming public 1825 (following the death of his nephew Leonardo Antonelli in 1811), and only after the decision of a judge was called into question by the municipal administration. The library was housed in the "Palazzo del Governo" in Piazza Navona, Roma, and three years later the first librarian, Canon Antonio Simoncelli, was appointed. Soon the books were transferred to Piazza Garibaldi, where a gymnasium was presented, and trusted with the Jesuit library, but always keeping it open to the public. In 1860, following the suppression of many religious orders, many publications of the library of the Servites and Capuchins were placed on the shelves of the library.

Closure and rebirth
After a period of neglect, which ended in 1930, also because of the earthquake that struck in the same year Senigallia, the library was moved to the Rinaldoni palace, in Via Fratelli Bandiera. However, before the transfer was completed, it was decided the Palazzo Gherardi, along the porticos of the village, would be used as its headquarters.

Since 1994 the library has been part of the National Library Service of Italy, four years later is used the current seat was given the location forum.

References

External links 

 Senigallia Public Library

Public libraries in Italy
Libraries established in 1825